The Human Medicines Regulations 2012  in the United Kingdom were created, under statutory authority of the European Communities Act 1972 and the Medicines Act 1968 in 2012. The body responsible for their upkeep is the Medicines and Healthcare products Regulatory Agency. The regulations partially repealed the Medicines Act 1968 in line with EU legislation.

Amendments
In October 2020, the regulations were amended to expand the workforce eligible to administer COVID-19 vaccines, so enabling additional healthcare professionals to vaccinate the public.  This was a temporary provision, but in January 2022 it was announced that this would be made permanent as would the provision for community pharmacy contractors to provide COVID-19 and flu vaccines “away from their normal registered premises”.

Regulation 174
Regulation 174 provides an exemption to the requirement for authorisation of Regulation 46, allowing for the sale or supply of any medicinal product to be temporarily authorised by the licensing authority (MHRA) in response to the suspected or confirmed spread of pathogenic agents, toxins, chemical agents or nuclear radiation.

References

External links
 

National Health Service
Pharmaceutics
Life sciences industry
Pharmacy
2012 establishments in the United Kingdom
Department of Health and Social Care
Medical regulation in the United Kingdom
Biotechnology
Statutory Instruments of the United Kingdom
Health law in the United Kingdom